Luciano Parodi González (born February 16, 1994) is a Uruguayan professional basketball player for s.Oliver Würzburg of the German Basketball Bundesliga. A three-time Uruguayan League champion with Hebraica Macabi. Parodi was named Uruguayan League MVP and Finals MVP in 2016.

Early life
Parodi was born in Paysandú, Uruguay. He played for Paysandú and Hebraica Macabi youth teams.

Professional career

Hebraica Macabi (2009–2017)
After starting his career in 2009 with Paysandú, Parodi moved to Hebraica Macabi, later that same year. Parodi helped Hebraica to win the 2016 Uruguayan League championship, and he was named the Uruguayan League MVP. In his next season, Parodi averaged 12.8 points, 3.5 rebounds, 6.6 assists and 2.3 steals per game and helped Hebraica to win the title two years in a row.

Bahía Blanca (2017–2018)
On June 14, 2017, Parodi signed a one-year deal with the Argentine League team Bahía Blanca. On January 31, 2018, Parodi recorded a career-high 27 points, shooting 8-of-15 from the field, along with four rebounds and six assists in a 93–90 win over Boca Juniors.

Be'er Sheva / Sassari (2018)
On July 14, 2018, Parodi signed with the Israeli League team Hapoel Be'er Sheva for the 2018–19 season. However, on September 16, 2018, Parodi parted ways with Be'er Sheva before appearing in a game for them. On September 27, 2018, Parodi signed a one-year deal with the Italian League team Dinamo Sassari. On November 26, 2018, Parodi parted ways with Sassari after appearing in six games.

Corinthians (2018–2019)
On December 3, 2018, Parodi signed with Corinthians Paulista of the NBB.

Franca (2019–2020)
On June 28, 2019 Parodi signed with Franca for the 2019–20 NBB season.

Minas (2020–2021)
In summer 2020, he has signed with Minas of the NBB.

s.Oliver Würzburg (2021–present)
On June 23, 2021, he has signed with s.Oliver Würzburg of the German Basketball Bundesliga.

National team career
Parodi is a member of Uruguayan national basketball team, he participated in the 2013, 2015 and 2017 FIBA AmeriCup tournaments, as well as the 2019 FIBA World Cup qualification games.

References

External links
 FIBA Profile
 Eurobasket.com Profile
 Italian League Profile 
 RealGM Profile

1994 births
Living people
Basketball players at the 2019 Pan American Games
Dinamo Sassari players
Estudiantes de Bahía Blanca basketball players
Franca Basquetebol Clube players
Minas Tênis Clube basketball players
Novo Basquete Brasil players
Pan American Games competitors for Uruguay
Point guards
S.Oliver Würzburg players
Sport Club Corinthians Paulista basketball players
Sportspeople from Paysandú
Uruguayan expatriate basketball people in Argentina
Uruguayan expatriate basketball people in Brazil
Uruguayan expatriate basketball people in Italy
Uruguayan men's basketball players